Grant MacLaren may refer to:

Grant MacLaren (Travelers)
Grant MacLaren, president of BC Lions

See also
Grant McLaren, athlete